LUGNET (short for Lego Users Group Network) is one of the largest online Adult Fan of Lego (AFOL) communities. It was founded by Todd Lehman and Suzanne Rich.

Summary 
LUGNET provides a forum for Adult Fans of Lego to discuss Lego-related issues and post about creations using its NNTP, e-mail and web interfaces. LUGNET members can track their sets, build web pages, rate postings and create polls. The website also features a database of Lego sets and provides links to other major Lego sites. The aim of LUGNET is "To enrich the online experience for the LEGO enthusiast in a growing number of new ways".

References

External links 
 

Lego